Traditional Chinese calendar divides a year into 24 solar terms. Lìchūn, Risshun, Ipchun, or Lập xuân is the 1st solar term. It begins when the Sun reaches the celestial longitude of 315° and ends when it reaches the longitude of 330°. It more often refers in particular to the day when the Sun is exactly at the celestial longitude of 315°. In the Gregorian calendar, it usually begins around February 4 and ends around February 18 (February 19 East Asia time). It's also the beginning of a sexagenary cycle.

Lichun signifies the beginning of spring in East Asian cultures.

Pentads 
Each solar term can be divided into 3 pentads (候). They are: first pentad (初候), second pentad (次候) and last pentad (末候). Pentads in Lichun include:

 China
 First pentad: Dōng Fēng Jiě Dòng
 Yuè Lìng Qī Shí Èr Hòu Jí Jiě (月令七十二候集解) explains the name of this pentad:It is not called the 'winter ice meets the spring wind and melts in the spring wind' thaw, but  the 'east wind' thaw, because Lü Shi Chun Qiu said that the east is associated with wood, and wood generates fire, so the air is warm and causes ice to thaw. (凍結于冬遇春風而解散不曰春而曰東者呂氏春秋曰東方屬木木火母也然氣溫故解凍)
 Second pentad
 Last pentad

 Japan
 First pentad: 東風解凍
 Second pentad: 黄鶯睍睆
 Last pentad: 魚上氷

Date and time

Customs

China 
Lichun traditionally signifies the beginning of spring in East Asian cultures. Chinese New Year is celebrated around this time. Farmers often celebrate the beginning of Lichun with special village events, worship and offerings to the Taoist and Buddhist gods and ceremonies for a blissful and prosperous new year. In China, people eat chūnbǐng (春餅) on this day. 

According to some schools of Feng Shui, if you are born after Chinese New Years but before or even on the first day of Lichun you are considered the zodiac animal of the previous Chinese lunar year.

In the lunisolar calendar, New Year's Day might be before or after Lichun. A year without Lichun is called 無春年 (no spring year). 無春年 is also known as 寡婦年 (widow year) in northern China or 盲年 (blind year) in southern China. Marriage is believed to be unlucky in a year without Lichun.

In the Republic of China, Lichun has been Farmer's Day since 1941.

In Singapore, there is a practice of depositing money into bank accounts on Lichun which many believe will bring them good fortune.

Korea 
Ipchun is the first season of the new year, so there are many farming-related events.

In Ipchun, families, regardless of the city or countryside, put their writings on walls or thresholds as a blessing event. 

These writings are also called Ipchunchuk, Chunchuk, Ipchunseo, Ipchunbang, and Chunbang.

Those who know the letters write themselves, and those who do not know how to write, ask others to write them.

It is said that it is good to attach it at the time of Ipchun, but it is not written in the house where the funeral is held.

About 
Lichun was frequently mentioned in literature. The most famous reference is probably Du Fu's (杜甫) shi (詩), simply titled Lìchūn (立春):

This poem tells us about the traditional custom of eating chūnbǐng (春餅) on this day.

See also 
 Setsubun (節分), the day before the beginning of each season, celebrated as winter changes to spring in Japan
 Egg of Li Chun

References

Further reading 
 Yuè Lìng Qī Shí Èr Hòu Jí Jiě (月令七十二候集解) by Wu Cheng (吳澄)

01
Spring (season)